Lautaro Joel Parisi (born 22 March 1994) is an Argentine professional footballer who plays as a forward for Estudiantes BA.

Career
Parisi had a stint in the youth systems of Academia Griffa and Argentinos Juniors, who he had a spell in the first-team with though didn't feature. 2016 saw the forward join Ferro Carril Oeste in Torneo Federal A, making his senior bow on 8 October against Defensores de Belgrano prior to netting his opening goals in March 2017 in fixtures with Deportivo Maipú and Independiente. Ten goals followed in the 2017–18 campaign, notably scoring a brace over Deportivo Roca. On 22 July 2018, Parisi joined Primera B Nacional's Guillermo Brown. His first appearance, versus Brown on 26 August, doubled up as his professional league debut.

In July 2019, after seven goals in 2018–19, Parisi completed a move to newly-promoted Primera División team Arsenal de Sarandí. He netted his first top-flight goal on 18 August versus Defensa y Justicia, which turned out to be his only goal for the club across eleven matches. In September 2020, Parisi signed a six-month contract with Estudiantes of Primera B Nacional; after rejecting a longer contract from Caballito's Ferro Carril Oeste.

Personal life
Gonzalo Parisi is the brother of Lautaro. They faced each other for the first time on 22 March 2017, as Lautaro's Ferro Carril Oeste lost 1–2 to Gonzalo's Deportivo Maipú, though the former scored his club's only goal.

Career statistics
.

References

External links

1994 births
Living people
People from General Pico
Argentine footballers
Association football forwards
Torneo Federal A players
Primera Nacional players
Argentine Primera División players
Argentinos Juniors footballers
Guillermo Brown footballers
Arsenal de Sarandí footballers
Estudiantes de Río Cuarto footballers
Guillermo Brown de Puerto Madryn footballers
Atlético de Rafaela footballers
Estudiantes de Buenos Aires footballers